On The Nameless Height (Na bezymyannoy vysote), also known as Nearby an Unfamilial Settlement (U neznakomogo posyolka) is a Soviet World War II song. The text was written by Mikhail Matusovskiy in 1963, with music by Veniamin Basner, and is one of the themes of the war-based movie "Silence" (Tishina), released in 1964. The song is based on true historical events and glorifies three lucky soldiers, surviving out of an eighteen-soldier infantry squad. The height concerned the one located near the Rubezhenka settlement in the Kuybyshevsky District, Kaluga Oblast while the soldiers, mentioned in song, were a part of Soviet 139th infantry division.

Background
In August 1943 the 139th Rifle Division was reinforced with newly arrived draftees-volunteers. Eighteen newly arrived factory workers from Novosibirsk were given a task to stealthily occupy a height behind enemy lines in the vicinity of today's settlement Rubezhonka in Kaluga Oblast. Headed by the Second Lieutenant Yevgeniy Proshin, they were given the deadline to accomplish their mission by September 14. Their call sign was Luna. Upon completion of the task Luna gave a positive SITREP for a successful mission. However, they were spotted soon by a German patrol, which led to their encirclement and elimination. No real evaluation of the mission was recorded. Despite the lyrics which mention three survivors, there were in fact only two: Sergeant Konstantin Vlasov and Private Gerasim Lapin. Their lives were miraculously spared when they were knocked unconscious. Sergeant Vlasov was captured as a prisoner, but was later able to escape to partisans; Private Lapin was found among the dead by the advancing elements of Soviet Armed Forces.

Nikolai Danilenko, Dmitriy Yaruta, Yemelyan Belokonov, Petr Panin, Dmitriy Shliakhov, Roman Zakomoldin, Nikolai Galenkin, Timofei Kasabiyev, Gavriil Vorobyov, Aleksandr Artamonov, Dmitriy Lipovitser, Boris Kigel, Daniil Denisov, Petr Romanov, and Ivan Kulikov were among the soldiers who died while carrying out the mission.

Translated lyrics

See also
On the Nameless Height a film

References

External links
Russian lyrics

1963 songs
1963 in the Soviet Union
Russian songs
Soviet songs